Oulu International Children's and Youth Film Festival is an annual children's film festival held in November in Oulu, Finland. The festival has been founded in 1982 by the Oulu Film Centre.

There has been  Children's Film competition at the festival since 1992. The jury of ten children chooses the best film and the Starboy Award is granted to the director of the film. Other awards are the ECFA Award for the best European film, the For Tomorrow Award to the best youth film and a prize of the Media Foundation of the Evangelical Lutheran Church of Finland for a Finnish feature or short film at the film festival. The main venue for the festival is the Cultural Centre Valve in the city centre, films are also shown in the Finnkino cinema.

References

Children's film festivals
Culture in Oulu
Film festivals in Finland
Recurring events established in 1982
1982 establishments in Finland
Autumn events in Finland